Sir Ernest Barker  (23 September 1874 – 17 February 1960) was an English political scientist who served as Principal of King's College London from 1920 to 1927.

Life and career
Ernest Barker was born in Woodley, Cheshire, and educated at Manchester Grammar School and  Balliol College, Oxford. Barker was a Fellow of Merton College, Oxford, from 1898 to 1905, St John's College, Oxford, from 1909 to 1913, and New College, Oxford, from 1913 to 1920. He spent a brief time at the London School of Economics. He was Principal of King's College London from 1920 to 1927, and subsequently became Professor of Political Science in the University of Cambridge in 1928, being the first holder of the chair endowed by the Rockefeller Foundation.

In June 1936 he was elected to serve on the Liberal Party Council. He was knighted in 1944. He was elected a Foreign Honorary Member of the American Academy of Arts and Sciences in 1958.

Barker was married twice, firstly in 1900 to Emily Isabel Salkeld, with whom he had a son and two daughters; she died in 1924. In 1927 he married Olivia Stuart Horner; they had a son, Nicolas Barker, and a daughter.

Barker died on 17 February 1960. There is a memorial stone to him in St Botolph's Church, Cambridge.

Works

 The Political Thought of Plato and Aristotle (1906)
 The Republic of Plato (1906)
Articles for the Encyclopedia Britannica (1911)
Ernest Barker, H. W. Carless Davis, C. R. L. Fletcher, Arthur Hassall, L. G. Wickham Legg, F. Morgan, Why We Are at War: Great Britain's Case, by Members of the Oxford Faculty of Modern History (Oxford: Clarendon Press, 1914) 
 Political Thought in England from Herbert Spencer to the present day: 1848-1914 (1915)
 Greek Political Theory: Plato and his Predecessors (1918)
 Ireland in the last Fifty Years: 1866-1918 (1919)
The Crusades (1923). A later edition of the Encyclopædia Britannica article, edited with additional notes.
 Translator's Introduction (1934) to Otto von Gierke, Natural Law and the Theory of Society (1934)
 Oliver Cromwell and the English People (1937)
 Britain and the British People (1942)
 Reflections on Government (1942)
 "The Development of Public Services in Western Europe 1660-1930" (1944)
 The Politics of Aristotle (1946)
 Character of England edited (1947)
 Traditions of Civility (1948)
 Principles of Social and Political Theory (1951)
 Essays on Government (1951)
 The European Inheritance, edited with Sir George Clark and Professor P. Vaucher (3 volumes, 1954)
 Age and Youth: Memories of Three Universities and the Father of Man (1953)
 Social Contract: Essays by Locke, Hume, and Rousseau (1956)

References

Further reading
 Author and Book Info.com
 Arthur Aughey (2007) The Politics of Englishness; Manchester University Press
 Andrezj Olechnowicz, 'Liberal anti-fascism in the 1930s: The case of Sir Ernest Barker', Albion 36, 2005, pp. 636–660
 Julia Stapleton (1994), Englishness and the Study of Politics: The Social and Political Thought of Ernest Barker
 Julia Stapleton (2007), Ernest Barker in Brack & Randall (eds.), The Dictionary of Liberal Thought, Politico's Publishing
 Julia Stapleton (editor) Polis, vol. 23:2 (2006), Ernest Barker: A Centenary Tribute

External links

 
 Political Studies Association Hall of Fame
 

Academics of the University of Cambridge
Alumni of Balliol College, Oxford
British political scientists
Converts to Anglicanism from Congregationalism
English Anglicans
Fellows of the American Academy of Arts and Sciences
Knights Bachelor
People from Cheshire
People educated at Manchester Grammar School
Principals of King's College London
Commanders Crosses of the Order of Merit of the Federal Republic of Germany
Officiers of the Légion d'honneur
1874 births
1960 deaths
Fellows of Merton College, Oxford